Mitochondrial carrier homolog 1 (MTCH1), also referred to as presenilin 1-associated protein (PSAP), is a protein that in humans is encoded by the MTCH1 gene on chromosome 6. MTCH1 is a proapoptotic mitochondrial protein potentially involved in Alzheimer’s disease (AD).

Structure
The protein encoded by this gene is named for its structural resemblance to the members of the mitochondrial carrier protein family. The MTCH1 gene contains 12 exons and produces four isoforms. These isoforms arise from alternative splicing of exon 8 and two potential start codons, which results in the deletion of 17 amino acid residues in the hydrophilic loop between two transmembrane domains of some isoforms. Though they differ in sequence and length, the four isoforms still share a similar topological structure, including six transmembrane domains, one of which is responsible for localization to the outer mitochondrial membrane (OMM), and two N-terminal apoptotic domains. As a result, all four isoforms retain these apoptotic domains and mitochondrial localization, both of which are required for the protein’s proapoptotic function.

Function
MTCH1 is a proapoptotic protein that localizes to the OMM and induces apoptosis independently of BAX and BAK. One possible mechanism proposes that its interactions with the mitochondrial permeability transition pore (MPTP) complex leads to depolarization of the mitochondrial membrane, release of cytochrome C, and activation of caspase-3. Expression of this protein is observed in 16 different tissue types, indicating that the protein may serve a housekeeping function.

Clinical Significance
MTCH1 may be associated with AD and other neurodegenerative and neuroinflammatory diseases through its close interaction with presenilin. However, more research is required to confirm its clinical involvement.

Interactions
MTCH1 has been shown to interact with PS1.

References

Further reading